The Wright R-2160 Tornado was an experimental 42-cylinder, 7-cylinder per row, 6-row liquid-cooled inline radial aircraft engine. It was proposed in 1940 with 2,350 hp (1,752 kW) for experimental aircraft such as the Lockheed XP-58 Chain Lightning, Vultee XP-68 Tornado, and the Republic XP-69.

Specifications

See also

References
 Kim McCutcheon, Tornado: Wright Aero's Last Liquid-cooled Piston Engine

External links

 Republic XP-69
 Technical Drawings & CAD Renders
Specifications & Picture

42-cylinder engines
Wright aircraft engines
1940s aircraft piston engines
Inline radial engines
Abandoned military aircraft engine projects of the United States
Water-cooled radial engines